is a Japanese ice hockey player. He competed in the men's tournaments at the 1976 Winter Olympics and the 1980 Winter Olympics.

References

External links
 

1953 births
Living people
Japanese ice hockey players
Oji Eagles players
Olympic ice hockey players of Japan
Ice hockey players at the 1976 Winter Olympics
Ice hockey players at the 1980 Winter Olympics
Sportspeople from Hokkaido